The following is a list of episodes from Super Why!, a PBS Kids series.

Series overview

Episodes

Pilot (2000)

Season 1 (2007–2010)

Season 2 (2011–2012)
Nicholas Kaegi replaces Nicholas Castel Vanderburgh in the role of Whyatt Beanstalk / Super Why.

Season 3 (2015–2016)
Johnny Orlando replaces Nicholas Kaegi in the role of Whyatt Beanstalk / Super Why, Samuel Faraci replaces Zachary Bloch in the role of Pig / Alpha Pig, and T.J. McGibbon replaces Siera Florindo in the role of Red / Wonder Red.

References

Super Why!
Super Why!